Vexin is a protein encoded by VXN gene. VXN is found to be highly expressed in regions of the brain and spinal cord.

Gene

Location 
VXN is found along the plus strand of chromosome 8. The entire gene is 58,522 bp long. VXN is flanked by alcohol dehydrogenase iron containing 1 and Myb proto-oncogene like 1.

Homology

Paralogs 
No human paralogs for VXN have been identified

Orthologs 

Vexin is found in all classes of vertebrates, including mammals, birds, fish, reptiles and amphibians. The most distant ortholog of VXN is in Callorhinchus milli, which diverged from the human version of the gene an estimated 482.9 million years ago. The gene has not been found in any plants, fungi or single celled organisms.

Homologous domains 
The N-terminus and C-terminus are highly conserved regions across both distant and close orthologs. The orthologs of vexin all show conservation of the SH3 protein domain family as well as a domain of unknown function (DUF4648).

mRNA

Splice variants 
VXN does not have any alternative mRNA splice variants. The mature mRNA is approximately 3,741 base pairs in length and contains six exons.

Protein

General properties 

Vexin is 207 amino acids long, which equates to a molecular weight of 22.6 kdal. The isoelectric point of the protein is 10.42 which indicates the pH of the protein is basic. Vexin does contain a domain of unknown function (DUF4648) and is a part of the SH3 domain family, which is known to bind to proline-rich ligands. The secondary and tertiary structure of this protein is not well known.

Composition 
Vexin is considered rich in arginine, and poor in phenylalanine compared to the composition of the average human protein. Vexin does contain several regions of positively charged runs and has a high concentration of basic amino acids.

Post-translational modifications 
Vexin is predicted to undergo several types of post translational modifications. With a high degree of certainty, it is predicted that vexin undergoes lysine glycation, O-glycosylation, serine, threonine and tyrosine phosphorylation, SUMOylation and initial methionine acetylation.

Subcellular location 
 Vexin is predicted to be a nuclear protein, given the classical nuclear localization signal found at amino acids Lys191 to Lys193. Vexin does not contain any transmembrane domains or signal peptides suggesting that it is an intracellular protein.

Expression 

VXN has shown to be ubiquitously expressed in the body. The gene is expressed in 13 different types of tissue throughout the body, with the brain, spinal cord and nerves showing elevated expression of the gene. Specifically, the isocortex and hippocampal formation areas of the brain show high levels of expression. In addition to healthy tissue, vexin is also found in several disease states. These disease states include chondrosarcoma, glioma, kidney tumors, liver tumors, and germ cell tumors. VXN is only expressed in infants and adults.

Clinical significance 
VXN has been associated with breast cancer in humans. The gene has been researched in connection with estrogen receptor 1- enhancer (ESR1), whose expression determines if a breast cancer patient receives endocrine therapy. It is predicted that VXN has ESR1 enhancer regions that become hypermethylated and promote acquired endocrine resistance in breast cancer.

References

Further reading 

  
 
 

Uncharacterized proteins